Poll Bludger is a website that focuses on opinion poll analysis and Australian politics. The newspaper Crikey has labelled it "one of the most heavily trafficked forums for online discussion of Australian politics".

The website also hosts the Bludger Tracker, a "bias-adjusted poll aggregate".

Bowe has been involved in electoral analysis with news organisations such as Crikey, The Conversation, and ABC Radio.

References

Aggregation websites
English-language websites
Data journalism
Opinion polling in Australia
Political blogs
Australian political websites